The Pattern 1861 Enfield  musketoon was a short-barrel version (610 mm or 24 inches) of the Pattern 1853 Enfield rifled musket, having a faster rifling twist rate (1:48 versus 1:78), along with more rifling grooves (five grooves versus the Pattern 1853's three grooves), which made it as accurate as the rifle at shorter ranges.  The much shorter barrel would otherwise reduce the accuracy at longer ranges.   The shorter rifle was therefore easier to carry and reload.

Usage
In the British Army, the Pattern 1861 was issued to artillery units, who required a weapon for personal defence and which could be more easily wielded from horseback. They were also imported by the Confederacy during the American Civil War and issued to artillery and cavalry units.  However, the longer Pattern 1853 was more suitable for infantry units which fought in line formation of several ranks deep, in order to minimize the risk that the men in the rear ranks would accidentally shoot the men in the front ranks in the back of the head, or scorch their faces and burst their eardrums with the muzzle blast.

It was much liked for its ease of handling, and being designed for use with Minié ball bullets they could have a lethal range of up to 500 yards.

This weapon is often referred to as a musketoon but due to it having a rifled barrel is more accurately known as a carbine.  Note that Enfield Pattern 58 'short rifle' is almost a foot [30cms] longer.  This mistake is prevalent in the popular literature probably due to the misnomer being applied to a Parker Hale reproduction.

See also
 Pattern 1853 Enfield, a longer rifle musket of very similar design.
 British military rifles
 Rifles in the American Civil War

References

External links

American Civil War rifles
Weapons of the Confederate States of America
Victorian-era weapons of the United Kingdom
Weapons of the United Kingdom